Joseph Henri Picard (February 18, 1857 – May 23, 1934) was a politician in Alberta, Canada and a municipal councillor in Edmonton.

Picard was born in Saint-Jean-de-Matha, Quebec on February 18, 1857. He apprenticed as a carpenter before coming west in 1884 to Fort Qu'Appelle and then Regina. In Calgary, he met Father Albert Lacombe, who suggested to him that he move to Edmonton, which he did in 1887. Once in Edmonton, he opened a general store, Larue & Picard; it was sold in 1907 when both he and his partner retired.

In 1903, he married Martine Voyer. The couple had two sons.

His political career began in 1894 when he was elected as an alderman to Edmonton Town Council, finishing fifth of nine candidates in an election in which the top six were elected. He was re-elected in 1895, but defeated in 1896, placing seventh of eight candidates. He placed dead last of nine candidates in the following election, but returned to council in 1897, placing third of nine candidates.

In 1898, when staggered aldermanic terms were introduced, the top three finishers in the election were elected to two year terms, while the bottom three were elected to one year terms. Picard was one of the latter, and ceased to be an alderman in 1899. His next attempt at election took place in 1902, when he placed last of five candidates. He was elected again in 1903, finishing third of nine and being elected to a two-year term. However, this term was truncated when Edmonton became a city in 1904 and a new, eight member city council was elected. In that year's election, Picard finished sixth of seventeen candidates, and was elected to another one year term (the top four candidates won two year terms). He was re-elected to a two-year term in 1905, placing fourth of ten candidates.

At the expiration of this term in 1907, Picard ran for mayor, but was defeated by John Alexander McDougall. He stayed out of politics for seven years thereafter.

In 1914, Picard returned to office, finishing fourth of fourteen candidates. However, he was defeated in his 1916 re-election bid, finishing seventh of eleven candidates. This marked the end of his career in municipal politics.

Joseph Henri Picard was a member of the Catholic school board from 1899 until 1925, and was also active with the Board of Trade, the Catholic Mutual Benefit Association, the Edmonton Club, the Edmonton Exhibition Board, l'Alliance Française, La Société Saint-Jean Baptiste, La Société du Parler Français, and the Liberal Party of Alberta.

Picard died May 23, 1934. École J. H. Picard School in Edmonton is named in his honour.

References
Edmonton Public Library Biography of Joseph Henri Picard
City of Edmonton biography of Joseph Henri Picard
J. H. Picard School biography of Joseph Henri Picard

1857 births
1934 deaths
Edmonton city councillors
Franco-Albertan people
People from Lanaudière